The Roman Catholic Territorial Prelature of Humahuaca is in Argentina and is a suffragan of the Archdiocese of Salta.

History
On 8 September 1969, Pope Paul VI established the Territorial Prelature of Humahuaca from territory taken from the Diocese of Jujuy and the Archdiocese of Salta.

Ordinaries
José María Márquez Bernal, C.M.F. (10 October 1973 – 20 February 1991)
Pedro María Olmedo Rivero, C.M.F. (7 July 1993 – 23 October 2019)
Florencio Félix Paredes Cruz, C.R.L. (23 October 2019 – present)
 10 March 2018 appointed Territorial Prelate Coadjutor

References

Roman Catholic dioceses in Argentina
Roman Catholic Ecclesiastical Province of Salta
Territorial prelatures
Christian organizations established in 1969
Roman Catholic dioceses and prelatures established in the 20th century